Walton Edwin Cruise (May 6, 1890 – January 6, 1975), born in Childersburg, Alabama, was an outfielder for the St. Louis Cardinals (1914, 1916–1919) and Boston Braves (1919–1924).

In 10 seasons, he played in 736 games and had 2,321 at bats, 293 runs, 644 hits, 83 doubles, 39 triples, 30 home runs, 272 RBI, 49 stolen bases, 238 walks, a .277 batting average, a .348 on-base percentage, a .386 slugging percentage, 895 total bases, and 79 sacrifice hits.

He died in Sylacauga, Alabama, at the age of 84.

Sources

1890 births
1975 deaths
People from Childersburg, Alabama
Major League Baseball outfielders
St. Louis Cardinals players
Boston Braves players
Baseball players from Alabama
Hattiesburg Woodpeckers players
Macon Peaches players
Chattanooga Lookouts players
Jacksonville Tarpons players
St. Paul Saints (AA) players
Los Angeles Angels (minor league) players